WVAX (1450 AM) is a sports formatted broadcast radio station licensed to Charlottesville, Virginia, serving Charlottesville and Albemarle County, Virginia.  WVAX is owned and operated by the Charlottesville Radio Group subsidiary of Saga Communications.

History

WVAX is Charlottesville's newest AM station. The initial construction permit was applied for in January 2004 by Anderson Communications LLC, owned by Charles M. Anderson of Bowling Green, Kentucky, who holds separate interests in several FM stations in that state. The construction permit was granted in September 2005, and by the end of the month Anderson sold it to Saga Communications for $150,000.

Saga put the station on the air on January 20, 2006 with a progressive talk format from Air America. Air America ceased national programming in January 2010, precipitating format changes at many of its affiliates. WVAX continued with the talk format until April 1, 2011, when it flipped to national sports radio programming from ESPN Radio.

In May 2016, WVAX signed-on a 100-watt FM translator on 103.1 MHz from the Charlottesville antenna farm on Carter Mountain. This translator attracted opposition from Piedmont Communications, and listeners of their co-channel WJMA Culpeper filed interference complaints. Saga's investigation into the interference was largely inconclusive, as several persons admitted that they did not personally experience interference and only complained after a DJ prompted them on-air, while others refused to meet with investigators or did not respond to follow-ups at all. In June 2017, Saga moved the translator to 102.9 MHz to end the dispute without admitting wrongdoing.

Translator
In addition to the main station, WVAX is relayed by an FM translator to widen its broadcast area.

References

External links
1450 ESPN Online

2006 establishments in Virginia
Sports radio stations in the United States
ESPN Radio stations
Radio stations established in 2006
VAX
Mass media in Charlottesville, Virginia